Undressed Momento is the first full-length album by Italian alternative rock band Klimt 1918. It was released in 2003 on My Kingdom Music.

It features a more experimental sound than their previous effort, Secession Makes Post-Modern Music, although still firmly rooted in gothic rock and metal.

Track listing
 "_" – 1:17
 "Pale Song" – 4:13
 "Parade Of Adolescence" – 4:37
 "We Don't Need No Music" – 5:52
 "Undressed Momento" – 6:36
 "That Girl" – 5:15
 "Naif Watercolour" – 6:16
 "If Only You Could See Me Now" – 6:30
 "Stalingrad Theme" – 5:58

Personnel
Marco Soellner — vocals, guitar
Alessandro Pace — guitar
Davide Pesola — bass
Paolo Soellner — drums

2003 albums
Klimt 1918 albums